Turkey competed at the 2012 Summer Paralympics in London, United Kingdom, from 29 August to 9 September 2012.

Medallists

| width="78%" align="left" valign="top" |

Multiple medalists

Archery

Men

|-
|align=left|Erdoğan Aygan
|align=left rowspan="3"|Ind. compound open
|637
|18
|W 6–0
|L 4–6
|colspan=4|Did not advance
|-
|align=left|Doğan Hancı
|671
|3
|
|W 7–1
|W 7–3
|L 3–7
|W 6–2
|
|-
|align=left|Abdullah Şener
|588
|28
|L 4–6
|colspan=5|Did not advance
|-
|align=left|Mustafa Demir
|align=left rowspan="2"|Ind. recurve W1/W2
|569
|17
|W 6–4
|L 2–6
|colspan=4|Did not advance
|-
|align=left|Özgür Özen
|597
|10
|W 6–2
|L 0–6
|colspan=4|Did not advance
|-
|align=left|Zafer Korkmaz
|align=left rowspan="2"|Ind. recurve standing
|588
|17
|W 6–0
|W 6–4
|L 4–6
|colspan=3|Did not advance
|-
|align=left|Oğuzhan Polat
|588
|19
|W 6–2
|W 6–4
|L 3–7
|colspan=3|Did not advance
|-
|align=left|Mustafa DemirZafer KorkmazÖzgür ÖzenOğuzhan Polat
|align=left|Team recurve open
|1773
|7
|
|W 197–190
|L 199–212
|colspan=3|Did not advance
|}

Women

|-
|align=left|Gülbin Su
|align=left|Ind. compound open
|615
|11
|
|W 6–4
|L 0–6
|colspan=3|Did not advance
|-
|align=left|Hatice Bayar
|align=left rowspan=3|Ind. recurve W1/W2
|498
|13
|W 6–0
|W 6–4
|L 2–6
|colspan=3|Did not advance
|-
|align=left|Özlem Hacer Kalay
|537
|7
|
|W 6–2
|L 2–6
|colspan=3|Did not advance
|-
|align=left|Gizem Girişmen
||533
||9
|
|W 7–1
|L 0–6
|colspan=3|Did not advance
|-
|align=left|Hatice BayarÖzlem Hacer KalayGizem Girişmen
|align=left|Team recurve open
|1568
|5
|colspan=2 
|L 175–183
|colspan=3|Did not advance
|}

Athletics

Men

Women

Football 5-a-side

Turkey has qualified for the football 5-a-side tournament.

Group play

5th–8th place semi-final

7th–8th place match

Goalball

Turkey competed for the first time in the men's goalball tournaments.

Group play

Quarter-final

Semi-final

Bronze medal match

Judo

Powerlifting

Men

Women

Shooting

Swimming

Turkey was represented for the first time at the swimming with 2 swimmers.

Men

Women

Table tennis

Six athletes competed for Turkey in table tennis. Athletes in classes 1 to 5 compete in wheelchairs, while classes 6 to 10 compete standing. Lower numbered classes indicate a higher severity disability. Athletes with intellectual disabilities compete in class 11.

Singles

Teams

Wheelchair basketball

Turkey qualified for the men's team event in wheelchair basketball by finishing eighth at the 2010 Wheelchair Basketball World Championship. Competing athletes are given an eight-level-score specific to wheelchair basketball, ranging from 0.5 to 4.5 with lower scores representing a higher degree of disability. The sum score of all players on the court cannot exceed 14.

Men's tournament

Group A

Quarter-final

5th–8th place semi-final

7th/8th place match

See also
Turkey at the Paralympics
Turkey at the 2012 Summer Olympics

Notes

Nations at the 2012 Summer Paralympics
2012
Paralympics